Soto Monir is a Bangladesh Awami League politician and the incumbent Member of Parliament of Tangail-2. He was the joint secretary of Awami League's branch in Germany.

Career
Monir, aka Tanvir Hasan, entered student politics as a member of Chhatra League in the early 1990s. However, he left Bangladesh at 1996 for higher studies at Moscow University in Russia. He then moved to Germany, and served as the joint-secretary of Awami League’s branch of the central European country. He came back to Bangladesh during 2006-08 Bangladeshi political unrest.

Monir was elected to parliament from Tangail-2 as a Bangladesh Awami League candidate at 30 December 2018. He was alleged of NID forgery, and arms smuggling, however the allegations were never proven and referred as "politically motivated conspiracy" by Monir's associates.

Monir serves as the secretary on science and technology of Tangail district Awami League. He is also the board chair of Tangail's branch of Bangladesh Worker's Federation.

Monir is an incumbent member of the Parliamentary Standing Committee on Ministry of Fisheries and Livestock at the 11th National Parliament of Bangladesh.

Personal life 
Monir is married to Oaishe Khan (Nishe), the only daughter of former Shipping Minister, current presidium member of Bangladesh Awami League and the incumbent Madaripur-2 MP Shajahan Khan.

References

External links

Soto Monir on Facebook
Oaishe Khan on Facebook

1978 births
Living people
11th Jatiya Sangsad members
Awami League politicians
Bangladeshi emigrants to Germany
People from Tangail District